John Muddiman (1947 – 5 December 2020) was a British academic and Anglican priest. He was the G. B. Caird Fellow in New Testament Theology at Mansfield College, Oxford, from 1990 until his retirement in 2012.

Early life and education
Muddiman was educated at King Edward VI School, Southampton. He studied at Keble College, Oxford and Selwyn College, Cambridge, and trained for Holy Orders at Westcott House, Cambridge. He studied for his DPhil under the supervision of G. B. Caird.

Career

Ordained ministry
Muddiman was ordained in the Church of England as a deacon in 1972 and as a priest in 1973. He studied for his doctorate, while simultaneously serving as Chaplain of New College, Oxford. He was a non-stipendiary priest at the Church of St Mary and St Nicholas, Littlemore from 1997 to 2012. He died on December 5, 2020 after a short illness.

Academic career
Amongst his academic works, he has produced a critically acclaimed examination of authorship in the Epistle to the Ephesians. Moreover, along with John Barton, he has co-edited the Oxford Bible Commentary, a particular favourite amongst undergraduate theologians. His most recent work is a study of the authenticity of the Pauline Epistles. He was co-editor of the Journal of Theological Studies from 2010 to 2012 (succeeding John Barton as biblical editor and being succeeded in turn by Katherine Southwood).

References 

Living people
Year of birth missing (living people)
Fellows of Mansfield College, Oxford
Alumni of Keble College, Oxford
Alumni of Selwyn College, Cambridge
Alumni of Westcott House, Cambridge